Lamelliconcha is a genus of molluscs in the subfamily Callocardiinae  of he family Veneridae.

Species
 Lamelliconcha alternata (Broderip, 1835)
 Lamelliconcha callicomata (Dall, 1902)
 Lamelliconcha circinata (Born, 1778)
 Lamelliconcha concinna (G. B. Sowerby I, 1835)
 Lamelliconcha paytensis (d'Orbigny, 1845)
 Lamelliconcha tortuosa (Broderip, 1835)
 Lamelliconcha unicolor (G. B. Sowerby I, 1835)
 Lamelliconcha vinacea Olsson, 1961
Synonyms
 Lamelliconcha concinnus (G. B. Sowerby I, 1835): synonym of Lamelliconcha concinns (G. B. Sowerby I, 1835) (wrong gender agreement of specific epithet)
 Lamelliconcha frizzelli (Hertlein & A. M. Strong, 1948): synonym of Callpita frizzelli (Hertlein & A. M. Strong, 1948)
 † Lamelliconcha kawadai Aoki, 1954: synonym of † Pliocardia kawadai (Aoki, 1954)  (original combination)

References

 Huber, M. (2010). Compendium of bivalves. A full-color guide to 3,300 of the world's marine bivalves. A status on Bivalvia after 250 years of research. Hackenheim: ConchBooks. 901 pp., 1 CD-ROM.

External links
 

Veneridae
Bivalve genera